"Remedy" is a song performed by Italian DJ duo Crookers featuring Swedish band Miike Snow. It was released on 19 February 2010 as the third single from Crookers' album Tons of Friends (2010).

Music video
The music video was directed by Paul Kamuf.

Track listing
Digital EP
"Remedy" – 3:13
"Remedy" (Cassius remix) – 9:19
"Remedy" (Cassius dub) – 8:23
"Remedy" (Cassius instrumental) – 9:20
"Remedy" (Magik Johnson vocal mix) – 5:59
"Remedy" (Magik Johnson Acid Thunder dub) – 5:35
"Remedy" (Riton Rerub) – 4:35
"Remedy" (AlexKid remix) – 6:18
"Remedy" (AlexKid dub) – 7:23
"Remedy" (Numan remix) – 5:12

Charts

References

External links

2010 singles
Miike Snow songs
Songs written by Andrew Wyatt
Songs written by Christian Karlsson (DJ)
Songs written by Pontus Winnberg
2010 songs